WKIT (100.3 FM) is a commercial radio station licensed to Brewer, Maine, serving the Bangor area of Central Maine. It airs a mainstream rock radio format, calling itself "The Rock of Bangor."

WKIT is part of the Zone Corporation, a Central Maine broadcasting group owned by authors Tabitha and Stephen King. It has studios and offices on Target Industrial Drive in Bangor. The transmitter is off Center Drive in Orrington.

WKIT is one of the few radio stations that still has a strong presence of live local announcers in the studio. However, on the weekends the station carries some syndicated programming. WKIT also streams its programming on the Internet via the official station website.

Notable on air personalities include the "Rock and Roll Morning Show" hosts Bobby Russell and Mark "The Shark" Young, midday host Don Cookson, afternoon host Scotty Moore and Simulcasting "Nights With Alice Cooper".

On Stephen King's official website, there is an advertisement for WKIT.

In King's novel 11/22/63, Jake saves most of the Dunning family and when he comes back to 2011 he looks up Ellen Dunning (who was 7 in 1958) and calls her, finding she's a "jock for WKIT in Bangor, you know, a disk jockey?".

WKIT's main competitors are Classic Rock 95.7 WWMJ in Ellsworth and Mainstream Rock WTOS-FM Skowhegan, which is simulcast on AM 910 and FM translator 105.3 in Bangor.

References

External links
WKIT official website

KIT
Mass media in Penobscot County, Maine
Classic rock radio stations in the United States
Radio stations established in 1979
1979 establishments in Maine
Brewer, Maine
Stephen King